The Methadones were a band formed in 1993 by guitarist/vocalist Dan Vapid. The Methadones initially lasted only a few shows before Vapid put them to the side to focus on his main band Screeching Weasel. By 1999 Dan was no longer a member of Screeching Weasel or his other band The Riverdales, and decided to restart The Methadones with B-Face of The Queers on bass, and Dan Lumley on drums. The band recorded their first album Ill at Ease in 2001. After the recording, B-Face and Lumley left the band. Schafer formed a new lineup of The Methadones with guitarist Mike Byrne, bassist Sensitive Pete, and drummer Mike Soucy.

On June 11, 2010, The Methadones announced their disbandment on their Myspace page stating that, "it's been 10 years and we've had a lot of fun, but we all agree that it's just time."

For their final release, simply entitled The Methadones, the band released a collection featuring five new songs, all of the band's 7" songs as well as some extras.

The Methadones reunited for a few songs during a performance of Dan Vapid and the Cheats at the Cobra Lounge in Chicago on May 27, 2011, and again in October 2014, for a show celebrating the 10th anniversary of Red Scare Industries.

Band members
Dan Vapid - vocals, guitar (1993, 1999–2010, 2011, 2014)
Sensitive Pete - guitar, bass (1993, 2001–2010, 2011, 2014)
Pat Buckley - drums (1993)
Dan Panic - drums (1993)
B-Face - bass (1999-2001)
Mike Byrne - guitar (2001-2010, 2011, 2014)
Dan Lumley - drums (1999-2001)
Mike Soucy - drums (2003-2010, 2011, 2014)
Ken Fused - guitar (2007)

Discography

Studio albums
Ill at Ease – A-F Records, September 25, 2001
Career Objective – Thick Records, July 15, 2003
Not Economically Viable – Thick Records, November 16, 2004
21st Century Power Pop Riot – Red Scare Industries, June 6, 2006
This Won't Hurt... – Red Scare Industries, July 10, 2007

Split albums
The Methadones/The Copyrights Split – Transparent Records, Jun, 2008

Singles
"I Believe" – Underground Communique! Records, June 26, 2009
"Gary Glitter" - It's Alive Records, 2009

Compilation albums
The Methadones – Asian Man Records, November 16, 2010

Compilation appearances
1157 Wheeler Avenue: A Memorial For Amadou Diallo – Failed Experiment Records, June 25, 2002
Sex and Subversion – Thick Records, October 28, 2003
Go Kart MP300 – Go Kart Records, October 28, 2003
AMP Presents Vol. 4 – American Music Press, February 22, 2005
Take Me Down To The Punkrock City – Squash,  June 1, 2005
Mean It Man – Thick Records, September 13, 2005
Punk Rock Mix Tape – FastMusic, 2006
Hair: Chicago Punk Cuts – Thick Records, September 12, 2006
I Killed Punk Rock - Bouncing Betty Records, October 3, 2006
Plea For Peace Vol. 2 - Asian Man Records, April 24, 2007
Insubordination Fest 2009 - Insubordination Records, May 4, 2010
 Red Scare Industries: 10 Years of Your Dumb Bullshit - Red Scare Industries, September 9, 2014

References

External links
Official Site No Longer Functioning.
2006 Interview
Thick Records Web Site
Red Scare
Myspace
The Methadones Interview from 9/18/06 on Pounce Online

1993 establishments in Illinois
A-F Records artists
Asian Man Records artists
Musical groups from Chicago
Musical groups established in 1993
Pop punk groups from Illinois